Euchromius californicalis, the California grass-veneer, is a moth in the family Crambidae. It was described by Alpheus Spring Packard in 1873. It is found in North America, where it has been recorded from British Columbia, Alberta, Washington, Idaho, Montana, North Dakota, South Dakota, Oregon, Wyoming, California, Nevada, Utah, Colorado and New Mexico. The habitat consists of grasslands.

The wingspan is 20–23 mm for males and 14–22 mm for females. The forewings are light brown with two yellow transverse lines. Adults are on wing from May to August.

References

Crambinae
Moths of North America
Fauna of the California chaparral and woodlands
Moths described in 1873